Areias is a freguesia ("civil parish") in the municipality of Barcelos, Portugal. The population in 2011 was 1,014, in an area of 2.51 km².

References

Freguesias of Barcelos, Portugal